The Peace History Society is an American scholarly society, affiliated to the American Historical Association, which defines its purpose as "The scholarly study of the deep-rooted causes of peace and war and the means to secure and maintain nonviolent resolutions to conflicts."

It was founded in 1964 in the aftermath of the assassination of John F. Kennedy, initially under the name Conference on Peace Research in History. It was renamed as the Peace History Society in 1994. Since 1972 it has published the journal Peace & Change: a Journal of Peace Research jointly with the Peace and Justice Studies Association.

References

Further reading
 Kimball, Jeffrey. "The Influence of Ideology on Interpretive Disagreement: A Report on a Survey of Diplomatic, Military and Peace Historians on the Causes of 20th Century U. S. Wars," History  Teacher 17#3 (1984) pp. 355-384 DOI: 10.2307/493146  online

External links

Academic organizations based in the United States
Organizations established in 1964
1964 establishments in the United States